Elderslie is a rural locality in the local government areas of Central Highlands and Southern Midlands in the Central region of Tasmania. The 2016 census determined a population of 149 for the state suburb of Elderslie.

History
Elderslie was gazetted as a locality in 1970.

Geography
The Jordan River flows through from north-east to south-east, forming small sections of the northern and southern boundaries as it enters and exits.

Road infrastructure
The C185 route (Elderslie Road) enters from the south-east and runs through the village to exit in the north-east. Route C182 (Pelham Road) starts at an intersection with C185 in the village and runs north-west until it exits. Route C183 (Bluff Road) starts at an intersection with C185 in the south-east and runs generally south-west until it exits.

References

Localities of Central Highlands Council
Localities of Southern Midlands Council
Towns in Tasmania